Pakpattan Railway Station is located in District Pakpattan, Punjab, Pakistan.

Route
This Railway Station is situated on Kasur, Vehari and Lodhran  Railway Track. Other Railway facilities are Locomotive shed,  Railway Hospital,  Turntable (railroad). Fareed Express is only express train running on this track.

See also
 List of railway stations in Pakistan
 Pakistan Railways

References

External links

Railway stations in Pakpattan District
Railway stations on Lodhran–Raiwind Line